Reza Alijani is an Iranian journalist, writer and nationalist-religious activist.

Alijani has been described as "Neo-Shariatist" and a leading post-Islamist intellectual figure.

Alijani has spent years in jail since 1980s. Amnesty International has designated him a prisoner of conscience.

He has been the editor of Iran-e-Farda before it was banned in 2000.

References

Living people
1962 births
Iranian journalists
Iranian religious-nationalists
Amnesty International prisoners of conscience held by Iran
Iranian expatriates in France